John  Paul Jones DeJoria (born April 13, 1944) is an American entrepreneur, self-made billionaire and philanthropist best known as a co-founder of the Paul Mitchell line of hair products and The Patrón Spirits Company. Due to his personal career and achievements in business from once being homeless to becoming a self-made billionaire and successful entrepreneur DeJoria has been described as a living example of the American Dream and has been featured in a number of reports and documentaries.

Early life and education
John Paul Jones DeJoria was born the second son of an Italian immigrant father and a Greek immigrant mother  on April 13, 1944, in the Echo Park neighborhood of Los Angeles, California. His parents divorced by the time he was two years old. When his single mother proved unable to support both children, they were sent to an East Los Angeles foster home and stayed there during the week until he was nine and returned to his mother. At nine he began selling Christmas cards and newspapers with his older brother to support his family.

Career
DeJoria spent two years in the United States Navy, serving on the USS Hornet. After that, he held a series of jobs including janitor, door-to-door encyclopedia salesman and insurance salesman.

DeJoria entered the world of hair care as an entry-level employee of Redken Laboratories. He was fired from this position. In 1980, he formed John Paul Mitchell Systems with hairdresser Paul Mitchell and a loan for $700 and while living in a 20-year-old Rolls-Royce automobile.

DeJoria co-founded the Patrón Spirits Company in 1989, is a founding partner of the House of Blues nightclub chain, and has interests in Madagascar Oil Ltd., Pyrat Rum, Smokey Mountain Bison Farm, llc, Ultimat Vodka, Solar Utility, Sun King Solar, Touchstone Natural Gas, Three Star Energy, Diamond Audio, a Harley-Davidson dealership, a diamond company (DeJoria), mobile technology developer ROK AMERICAS, the John Paul Pet Company which does hair and personal grooming for animals, and J&D Acquisitions LLC, the parent company for the Larson, Striper, Triumph, Marquis and Carver boat companies formed with Minneapolis-based investor Irwin L. Jacobs. In 2008, DeJoria became an advisory board member for The Beauty Channel; a streaming beauty and fashion-focused television station.

DeJoria has been active in the film industry as an executive producer and actor. He made a cameo appearance as himself, in the 2008 comedy You Don't Mess with the Zohan, and also in The Big Tease as the fictional John Paul Mitchell. DeJoria also made a cameo appearance in the Showtime series Weeds season 2. He narrated and appeared in television commercials for Patron in November 2011. He appeared on the November 1, 2013, broadcast of the ABC reality series Shark Tank as a guest investor, replacing series regular Robert Herjavec. With a 2017 net worth of US$3.1 billion, he is the 3rd richest "shark" of all time on the show, behind series regular Mark Cuban (2017 net worth: US $3.3 billion) and fellow "guest shark" Sir Richard Branson (2017 net worth: US $5.1 billion).

In 2018, DeJoria co-founded ROKiT Group alongside business partner Jonathan Kendrick. Since their start in 2018, DeJoria and Kendrick have expanded ROKiT Group, creating brands such as ROKiT Phones, ROKiT Telemedicine, ROKiT Drinks and more.

Patrón Tequila Express

DeJoria owns the Patrón Tequila Express, a historic private railroad car. It was built in 1927, and was previously used by the Gulf, Mobile and Ohio Railroad as Car No. 50. DeJoria bought the train car in 1996 and spent $2 million to renovate it. In addition to the mileage fees paid to Amtrak to transport the train car across the United States, it costs $10,000 a month to staff, maintain, store, and insure the Patrón Tequila Express.

Personal life
DeJoria is married. He and his wife, Eloise (née Broady), have contributed over $4,000 to the political campaigns of Senator Ted Cruz and over $5,000 to Texas Governor Rick Perry, among others, as well as to the DNC and many Democratic political candidates.

DeJoria is a supporter of Mobile Loaves & Fishes, Food4Africa, Mineseeker, and Blazer House. In 2008, DeJoria traveled to sub-Saharan Africa to join Nelson Mandela in his efforts to help feed over 17,000 orphaned children through Food4Africa. In the same year his company Paul Mitchell helped provide over 400,000 life-saving meals for the children. Dejoria is a co-creator of Grow Appalachia, an organization begun in 2009 which helps promote healthy food and teaching farming skills.

In 2017, a documentary named Good Fortune was released depicting the struggle and philanthropic work of DeJoria which later won the Audience Award for Best Documentary at Sundance.

In 2012, using a video, he showed his support for Captain Paul Watson of the Sea Shepherd Conservation Society, when Watson was detained in Germany for interfering with shark finning operations.  In December 2022 The Captain Paul Watson Foundation announced their first ship, the 'John Paul Dejoria II'. 

In 2019, he purchased the  former McDonald's global headquarters campus. This acquisition includes the Hamburger University training facility, in addition to the Hyatt-branded and managed hotel, The Hyatt Lodge.

In 2022, he pledged £20,000 to save the HMS Unicorn, one of the oldest surviving ships in the world.

See also

References

External links
 
 Interview at Handshakin.com

1944 births
20th-century American businesspeople
21st-century American businesspeople
American billionaires
American cosmetics businesspeople
American people of Greek descent
American people of Italian descent
Businesspeople from Los Angeles
Giving Pledgers
21st-century philanthropists
Living people
People from Echo Park, Los Angeles
United States Navy sailors